Skogen is a station on the Holmenkollen Line located between Voksenlia and Lillevann, in Oslo, Norway. The station was opened on 16 May 1916 with the extension of the line from Besserud to Frognerseteren. The architect for the station was Erik Glosimodt.

The greatest density of buildings around the station area are the apartment buildings of the Voksen Skog neighborhood on the slope on the line's west side. While there are no direct bus connections to Skogen station, there is a bus stop below these apartments.

References

External links

Map of station area, aerial photo can be accessed by clicking the "flyfoto" tab.

Oslo Metro stations in Oslo
1916 establishments in Norway
Railway stations opened in 1916